Jesse Herbert Choper is an American constitutional law scholar and a former Dean of the University of California, Berkeley, School of Law, where he currently holds the chair of the Earl Warren Professor of Public Law (Emeritus).

Biography
Choper was born in Wilkes-Barre, Pennsylvania to Edward and Dorothy Choper, who had immigrated from Russia, and educated in the public schools. He attended Wilkes University, receiving a B.A. in 1957. He then studied at the University of Pennsylvania School of Law, graduating Order of the Coif in 1960 while teaching courses at the Wharton School. After law school, he clerked for Chief Justice Earl Warren of the Supreme Court of the United States during the 1960 Term.

Following his clerkship, in 1961 Choper joined the faculty at the University of Minnesota Law School. In 1965, he began teaching constitutional law, corporate law, and other subjects at Boalt Hall, and served as dean from 1982 to 1992. During his career, Choper has served as visiting professor at Harvard Law School, Fordham Law School, and several European universities. In November 2015, he retired from teaching.

He has co-authored two case books on constitutional law, and one on corporate law called Choper, Coffee, Gilson. He is widely cited in the press as an expert on free speech and the constitution.

Choper is a member of the American Law Institute. In 2012, he was awarded the Bernard E. Witkin Medal by the California State Bar.

Since 2006, he has served as a member of the California Horse Racing Board.

Personal life

He is married to Mari Smith Choper, and they have two sons.

See also
 List of law clerks of the Supreme Court of the United States (Chief Justice)

References

Selected publications

Books
 Choper, Jesse H. Judicial Review and the National Political Process: A Functional Reconsideration of the Role of the Supreme Court (Chicago: The University of Chicago Press, 1980). 
 Securing Religious Liberty: Principles for Judicial Interpretation of the Religion Clauses (Chicago: The University of Chicago Press, 1995).

Casebooks
 Choper, Jesse; Fallon Jr, Richard; Kamisar, Yale; Shiffrin, Steven. Constitutional Law: Cases Comments and Questions (Eagan, Minn.; West Publishing) (American Casebook Series)(12th edition). 
 Choper, Jesse; Shiffrin, Steven. The First Amendment, Cases--Comments--Questions. (Eagan, Minn.; West Publishing) (American Casebook Series)(6th edition). 
 Choper, Jesse H.; Coffee Jr, John C.; Gilson, Ronald J. Cases and Materials on Corporations (Wolters Kluwer, 2012)(8th Edition).

External links
BerkeleyLaw Faculty
 

Living people
1935 births
People from Wilkes-Barre, Pennsylvania
Wilkes University alumni
University of Pennsylvania Law School alumni
UC Berkeley School of Law faculty
University of Minnesota Law School faculty
20th-century American educators
21st-century American educators
American legal scholars
Deans of law schools in the United States
Law clerks of the Supreme Court of the United States
First Amendment scholars
American scholars of constitutional law
American academic administrators
Fellows of the American Academy of Arts and Sciences